Keysland is a rural locality in the South Burnett Region, Queensland, Australia.

Geography 
The land use in Keysland includes cropping, horticultural, plantation forestry, but is predominantly grazing on native vegetation.

History 
The name of the district is presumed to derived from the surname of an early settler, Eric John Keys, who was resident in the district circa 1913 to circa 1959.

Keysland State School opened on 11 May 1915 and closed on 31 December 1974.  It was on the south-western corner of Wondai Proston Road and Kayes Road. It provided primary school education to children residing in the localities of Keysland, Kawl Kawl and Mount McEuen.

Education 
There are no schools in Keysland. The nearest primary schools are Wheatlands State School in Wheatlands to the east and Proston State School in Proston to the north-west. The nearest secondary schools are Proston State School (to Year 10) and Murgon State High School in Murgon to the east.

References 

South Burnett Region
Localities in Queensland